Trichopothyne is a genus of beetles in the family Cerambycidae, containing the following species:

 Trichopothyne hindostani Breuning, 1950
 Trichopothyne rondoni Breuning, 1964
 Trichopothyne strandiella Breuning, 1942

References

Agapanthiini